Emerald is a gemstone and a variety of the mineral beryl (Be3Al2(SiO3)6) colored green by trace amounts of chromium or sometimes vanadium. Beryl has a hardness of 7.5–8 on the Mohs scale. Most emeralds are highly included, so their toughness (resistance to breakage) is classified as generally poor. Emerald is a cyclosilicate.

Etymology
The word "emerald" is derived (via  and ), from Vulgar Latin: esmaralda/esmaraldus, a variant of Latin smaragdus, which was via  (smáragdos; "green gem") from a Semitic language. According to Webster's Dictionary the term emerald was first used in the 14th century.

Properties determining value

Emeralds, like all colored gemstones, are graded using four basic parameters–the four Cs of connoisseurship: color, clarity, cut and carat weight.  Normally, in the grading of colored gemstones, color is by far the most important criterion. However, in the grading of emeralds, clarity is considered a close second. A fine emerald must possess not only a pure verdant green hue as described below, but also a high degree of transparency to be considered a top gemstone.

This member of the beryl family ranks among the traditional "big four" gems along with diamonds, rubies and sapphires.

In the 1960s, the American jewelry industry changed the definition of emerald to include the green vanadium-bearing beryl. As a result, vanadium emeralds purchased as emeralds in the United States are not recognized as such in the United Kingdom and Europe. In America, the distinction between traditional emeralds and the new vanadium kind is often reflected in the use of terms such as "Colombian emerald".

Color

In gemology, color is divided into three components: hue, saturation, and tone. Emeralds occur in hues ranging from yellow-green to blue-green, with the primary hue necessarily being green. Yellow and blue are the normal secondary hues found in emeralds. Only gems that are medium to dark in tone are considered emeralds; light-toned gems are known instead by the species name green beryl. The finest emeralds are approximately 75% tone on a scale where 0% tone is colorless and 100% is opaque black. In addition, a fine emerald will be saturated and have a hue that is bright (vivid). Gray is the normal saturation modifier or mask found in emeralds;  a grayish-green hue is a dull-green hue.

Clarity

Emeralds tend to have numerous inclusions and surface-breaking fissures. Unlike diamonds, where the loupe standard, i.e. 10× magnification, is used to grade clarity, emeralds are graded by eye. Thus, if an emerald has no visible inclusions to the eye (assuming normal visual acuity) it is considered flawless. Stones that lack surface breaking fissures are extremely rare and therefore almost all emeralds are treated ("oiled", see below) to enhance the apparent clarity. The inclusions and fissures within an emerald are sometimes described as jardin (French for garden), because of their mossy appearance. Imperfections are unique for each emerald and can be used to identify a particular stone. Eye-clean stones of a vivid primary green hue (as described above), with no more than 15% of any secondary hue or combination (either blue or yellow) of a medium-dark tone, command the highest prices. The relative non-uniformity motivates the cutting of emeralds in cabochon form, rather than faceted shapes. Faceted emeralds are most commonly given an oval cut, or the signature emerald cut, a rectangular cut with facets around the top edge.

Treatments
Most emeralds are oiled as part of the post-lapidary process, in order to fill in surface-reaching cracks so that clarity and stability are improved. Cedar oil, having a similar refractive index, is often used in this widely adopted practice. Other liquids, including synthetic oils and polymers with refractive indexes close to that of emeralds, such as Opticon, are also used. The least expensive emeralds are often treated with epoxy resins, which are effective for filling stones with many fractures. These treatments are typically applied in a vacuum chamber under mild heat, to open the pores of the stone and allow the fracture-filling agent to be absorbed more effectively. The U.S. Federal Trade Commission requires the disclosure of this treatment when an oil-treated emerald is sold. The use of oil is traditional and largely accepted by the gem trade, although oil-treated emeralds are worth much less than untreated emeralds of similar quality. Untreated emeralds must also be accompanied by a certificate from a licensed, independent gemology laboratory. Other treatments, for example the use of green-tinted oil, are not acceptable in the trade. Gems are graded on a four-step scale; none, minor, moderate and highly enhanced. These categories reflect levels of enhancement, not clarity. A gem graded none on the enhancement scale may still exhibit visible inclusions. Laboratories apply these criteria differently. Some gemologists consider the mere presence of oil or polymers to constitute enhancement. Others may ignore traces of oil if the presence of the material does not improve the look of the gemstone.

Emerald mines

Emeralds in antiquity were mined in Ancient Egypt at locations on Mount Smaragdus since 1500 BC, and India and Austria since at least the 14th century AD. The Egyptian mines were exploited on an industrial scale by the Roman and Byzantine Empires, and later by Islamic conquerors. Mining in Egypt ceased with the discovery of the Colombian deposits. Today, only ruins remain.

Colombia is by far the world's largest producer of emeralds, constituting 50–95% of the world production, with the number depending on the year, source and grade. Emerald production in Colombia has increased drastically in the last decade, increasing by 78% from 2000 to 2010. The three main emerald mining areas in Colombia are Muzo, Coscuez, and Chivor. Rare "trapiche" emeralds are found in Colombia, distinguished by ray-like spokes of dark impurities.

In the first half of 2011, the Kagem Mines produced 3.74 tons of emeralds.

Emeralds are found all over the world in countries such as Afghanistan, Australia, Austria, Brazil, Bulgaria, Cambodia, Canada, China, Egypt, Ethiopia, France, Germany, India, Kazakhstan, Madagascar, Mozambique, Namibia, Nigeria, Norway, Pakistan, Russia, Somalia, South Africa, Spain, Switzerland, Tanzania, the United States, Zambia, and Zimbabwe. In the US, emeralds have been found in Connecticut, Montana, Nevada, North Carolina, and South Carolina. In 1997, emeralds were discovered in the Yukon Territory of Canada.

Origin determinations 
Since the onset of concerns regarding diamond origins, research has been conducted to determine if the mining location could be determined for an emerald already in circulation. Traditional research used qualitative guidelines such as an emerald's color, style and quality of cutting, type of fracture filling, and the anthropological origins of the artifacts bearing the mineral to determine the emerald's mine location.  More recent studies using energy dispersive X-ray spectroscopy methods have uncovered trace chemical element differences between emeralds, including ones mined in close proximity to one another.  American gemologist David Cronin and his colleagues have extensively examined the chemical signatures of emeralds resulting from fluid dynamics and subtle precipitation mechanisms, and their research demonstrated the chemical homogeneity of emeralds from the same mining location and the statistical differences that exist between emeralds from different mining locations, including those between the three locations: Muzo, Coscuez, and Chivor, in Colombia, South America.

Synthetic emerald

Both hydrothermal and flux-growth synthetics have been produced, and a method has been developed for producing an emerald overgrowth on colorless beryl. The first commercially successful emerald synthesis process was that of Carroll Chatham, likely involving a lithium vanadate flux process, as Chatham's emeralds do not have any water and contain traces of vanadate, molybdenum and vanadium. The other large producer of flux emeralds was Pierre Gilson Sr., whose products have been on the market since 1964. Gilson's emeralds are usually grown on natural colorless beryl seeds, which are coated on both sides. Growth occurs at the rate of 1 mm per month, a typical seven-month growth run produces emerald crystals 7 mm thick.

Hydrothermal synthetic emeralds have been attributed to IG Farben, Nacken, Tairus, and others, but the first satisfactory commercial product was that of Johann Lechleitner of Innsbruck, Austria, which appeared on the market in the 1960s. These stones were initially sold under the names "Emerita" and "Symeralds", and they were grown as a thin layer of emerald on top of natural colorless beryl stones.  Later, from 1965 to 1970, the Linde Division of Union Carbide produced completely synthetic emeralds by hydrothermal synthesis. According to their patents (attributable to E.M. Flanigen), acidic conditions are essential to prevent the chromium (which is used as the colorant) from precipitating. Also, it is important that the silicon-containing nutrient be kept away from the other ingredients to prevent nucleation and confine growth to the seed crystals. Growth occurs by a diffusion-reaction process, assisted by convection. The largest producer of hydrothermal emeralds today is Tairus, which has succeeded in synthesizing emeralds with chemical composition similar to emeralds in alkaline deposits in Colombia, and whose products are thus known as “Colombian created emeralds” or “Tairus created emeralds”. Luminescence in ultraviolet light is considered a supplementary test when making a natural versus synthetic determination, as many, but not all, natural emeralds are inert to ultraviolet light. Many synthetics are also UV inert.

Synthetic emeralds are often referred to as "created", as their chemical and gemological composition is the same as their natural counterparts. The U.S. Federal Trade Commission (FTC) has very strict regulations as to what can and what cannot be called a "synthetic" stone. The FTC says: "§ 23.23(c) It is unfair or deceptive to use the word "laboratory-grown", "laboratory-created", "[manufacturer name]-created", or "synthetic" with the name of any natural stone to describe any industry product unless such industry product has essentially the same optical, physical, and chemical properties as the stone named."

In culture and lore
Emerald is regarded as the traditional birthstone for May as well as the traditional gemstone for the astrological sign of Cancer (June/July)

Traditional  alchemical lore ascribes several uses and characteristics to emeralds:

The virtue of the Emerald is to counteract poison. They say that if a venomous animal should look at it, it will become blinded. The gem also acts as a preservative against epilepsy; it cures leprosy, strengthens sight and memory, checks copulation, during which act it will break, if worn at the time on the finger.

According to French writer  Brantôme ( 1540-1614)  Cortez had one of the emerald's which he had looted from Mexico  text engraved, Inter Natos Mulierum non surrexit major ("Among those born of woman there hath not arisen a greater,"  Matthew 11:11), in reference to John the Baptist. Brantôme considered engraving such a beautiful and simple product of nature sacrilegious and considered this act the cause for Cortez's loss in 1541 of an extremely precious pearl
(to which he dedicated a work, A beautiful and incomparable pearl), and even for the death of King Charles IX of France, who died (1574) soon afterward.

In American author L. Frank Baum's 1900 children's novel, The Wonderful Wizard of Oz, and the 1939 MGM film adaptation, the protagonist must travel to an Emerald City to meet the eponymous character, the Wizard.

The chief deity of one of India's most famous temples, the Meenakshi Amman Temple in Madurai, is the goddess  Meenakshi, whose idol is traditionally thought to be made of emerald.

Notable emeralds

Gallery

See also

List of emeralds by size
List of minerals
Mineral industry of Colombia
Cardinal gem
Sapphire
Ruby

References

Further reading
 Ali, Saleem H. (2006). The Emerald City: Emerald mining in Brazil (+Gemstone mining in other countries) https://web.archive.org/web/20071014012610/http://www.uvm.edu/envnr/gemecology/brazil.html 
 Cooper, J. C. (ed.) (1992). Brewer's Myth and Legend. New York: Cassell Publishers Ltd. .
 Giuliani, Gaston, Ed. (2022). Émeraudes, tout un monde. Led Editions du Piat, ISBN 978-2-917198-51-3
 Hurlbut, Cornelius S.; Klein, Cornelis (1985). Manual of Mineralogy (20th ed.). New York: John Wiley and Sons. .
 Sinkankas, John (1994). Emerald & Other Beryls. Prescott, Ariz.: Geoscience Press. .
 Tavernier, Jean-Baptiste (1925 [1676]). Travels in India (second edition), Volume II. Edited by William Crooke and translated by V. Ball. London: Oxford University Press.
 Weinstein, Michael (1958). The World of Jewel Stones. New York: Sheriden House. .
 Wise, Richard W. (2003). Secrets of the Gem Trade: The Connoisseur's Guide to Precious Gemstones. Lenox, Mass.: Brunswick House Press. . . Online Emerald chapters.

External links

 ICA's Emerald Page International Colored Gemstone Association Emerald Page

Beryl group